Copine is a restaurant in Seattle's Ballard neighborhood, in the U.S. state of Washington.

Description 
Copine is an American/New American restaurant in Seattle's Ballard neighborhood. The restaurant opened in July 2016. The restaurant's founders, Shaun McCrain and Jill Kinney, searched for a location to open the restaurant for more than a year. Before founding Copine, McCrain worked for Per Se. McCrain and Kinney worked at Seattle restaurant Book Bindery before departing; Book Bindery closed after their departure.

Reception 
Condé Nast Traveler recommends, "Pick another spot for that calamitous catch-up with the old high school crew, and save Copine for a quiet date, a strategy session with your business partner, or a big night out with mom and dad." In 2022, Aimee Rizzo included Copine in The Infatuation's overviews of Seattle's best takeout eateries and Ballad's best restaurants. In 2023, the restaurant was a semifinalist in the James Beard Foundation Award's Outstanding Restaurant category.

See also 
 List of New American restaurants

References

External links
 

2016 establishments in Washington (state)
Ballard, Seattle
New American restaurants in Seattle
Restaurants established in 2016